Gamovo is a rural locality (a selo) and the administrative center of Gamovskoye Rural Settlement, Permsky District, Perm Krai, Russia. The population was 5,464 as of 2010. There are 31 streets.

Geography 
Gamovo is located 21 km southwest of Perm (the district's administrative centre) by road. Sakmary is the nearest rural locality.

References 

Rural localities in Permsky District